2010 World Open may refer to:
2010 World Open (snooker), professional ranking snooker tournament
2010 Men's World Open Squash Championship,  the individual world championship for men's squash players
2010 Women's World Open Squash Championship, the individual world championship for women's squash players